Ganda may refer to:

Places
 Ganda, Angola
 Ganda, Tibet, China
 Ganda, the ancient Latin name of Ghent, a city in Belgium
 Ganda, a settlement in Kilifi County, Kenya

Other uses
 Baganda or Ganda, a people of Uganda
 Luganda or Ganda language, a language of Uganda
 Ganda and "Ganda", a 2018 album and song by GreatGuys

People
 Ganda (Chandela dynasty), 11th century ruler in central India
 Ganda (music producer), Puerto Rican music producer; see Baby Rasta & Gringo
 Vice Ganda (born 1976), Filipino comedian, television presenter, and actor

Given name
 Ganda Singh Datt (1830–1903), decorated soldier in the British Indian Army
 Ganda Singh Dhillon (died 1776), famous royal Sikh warrior

Surname
 Joseph Ganda (bishop) (born 1932), Archbishop of the Archdiocese of Freetown and Bo
 Joseph Ganda (footballer) (born 1997), Israeli footballer
 Matthew Ganda (born 1990), better known by his stage name Kainawa, British recording artist and record producer
 Oumarou Ganda (1935–1981), Nigerien director and actor

See also
 
 Gander (disambiguation)
 Uganda, a landlocked country in East Africa